Premières is a former commune in the Côte-d'Or department in eastern France. On 28 February 2019, it was merged into the new commune of Collonges-et-Premières.

Population

See also
Communes of the Côte-d'Or department
 Premiere

References

Former communes of Côte-d'Or
Populated places disestablished in 2019